Sassine Square is a town square in Beirut, Lebanon, it is one of the most prominent urban areas of East Beirut, Lebanon. It is located in the Achrafieh district.

Historically and popularly named after an old and prominent family of Achrafieh, Sassine Square was officially inaugurated in the early '90s under the auspices of President Elias Hrawi, Prime-Minister Rafic Hariri, Member of Parliament Michel Sassine, and the Municipal Council of Beirut City .

Sassine Square is reputed to be a key social and commercial focal point of the Lebanese capital. Beyond being a residential area with a large pedestrian and transportation hub, it hosts renowned commercial and leisure centers, including the ABC Mall, attracting large numbers of visitors and tourists .

Like the ancient Agora of the Greek towns, Sassine Square is becoming a meeting place where all the Lebanese from different cultures and confessions communicate daily.

On 19 October 2012, a car bomb exploded in an alley leading to Sassine street next to Sassine Square killing 8 including Wissam al-Hassan and injuring 78.

References

External links
  
 
 
Photo Of Sassine Square By Paul Saad
Article on the history of Ashrafieh and how it evolved through time - Interview with Former Ashrafieh MP Michel Sassine (Dec. 2011): https://www.scribd.com/doc/77669439/Interview-on-the-History-of-Achrafieh-with-HE-Michel-Sassine-Dec-2011

Beirut
Neighbourhoods of Beirut
Streets in Beirut